Sibusiso Innocent Zikode is the current president of the South African shack dwellers' movement, which he co-founded with others in 2005. Abahlali baseMjondolo claims to have an audited paid up membership of over 80 000 across South Africa. His politics have been described as 'anti-capitalist'. According to the Mail & Guardian "Under his stewardship, ABM has made steady gains for housing rights."

Biography
Zikode was born in the village of Loskop in 1975 and grew up in the town of Estcourt, in the midlands of KwaZulu Natal, South Africa. He was raised by a single mother working as a domestic worker. He completed Matric at Bonokuhle High School where he joined the Boy Scouts Movement.

A few years later he enrolled as a law student at what was formerly known as The University of Durban-Westville and is now part of the University of KwaZulu-Natal. However he was unable to pay fees or rent and in 1997 had to abandon his studies and move to the Kennedy Road shack settlement. He found work at a nearby gas station as a pump attendant.

Activism
Zikode has served a number of terms as the elected head of the South African shack dwellers' movement Abahlali baseMjondolo since October 2005. Before that he was the Chairperson of the Kennedy Road Development Committee. Although the movement campaigns for basic services, like water and electricity, as well as land and housing, Zikode is clear that its demands go beyond immediate material needs. He has said that ""The house on its own cannot solve the problem. It's not only money that creates dignity. All governments should accept that our communities are part of the greater society." He argues for an immediate assertion of equality and for meaningful engagement with the poor by saying that, "The government and academics speak about the poor all the time, but so few want to speak to the poor".

He was critical of evictions linked to the 2010 FIFA World Cup and supported the August 2010 Public Sector Worker's strike in South Africa. He supports the occupation of unused land.

Commenting in response to Zikode's newspaper article 'We are the Third Force' veteran South African journalist Max du Preez commented that "I have never read anything as compelling, real and disturbing as the piece written in The Star last week by S'bu Zikode".

Mark Hunter argues that Zikode evokes a conception of housing rooted in an idea of dignity rather than a technical, numbers driven approach to the housing crisis.

Zikode's writing has been anthologised in the Verso Book of Dissent and published in newspapers like The Guardian and Libération.

Awards and recognition
On 16 December 2009 he was presented with the Order of the Holy Nativity by Bishop Rubin Phillip.

In 2012 the Mail & Guardian newspaper declared him to be one of the two hundred most important young South Africans.

In 2018 a new land occupation in Germiston in the East Rand, outside of Johannesburg, was named after Zikode.

In 2019 a new land occupation in Tembisa outside of Johannesburg was named after Zikode

On 25 March 2021 he was announced as the 2021 recipient of the Per Anger Prize, awarded by the Swedish government for humanitarian work and initiatives in the name of democracy.

Repression
In February 2006 Zikode was prevented by the police from taking up an invitation to appear on a television talk show. In September 2006 Zikode, and the then Deputy Chair of the movement Philani Zungu, were arrested on trumped up charges and tortured by Superintendent Glen Nayager in the Sydenham Police Station.'I was punched, beaten' , Niren Tolsi, Mail & Guardian, 16 September 2006,

In September 2009, Kennedy Road was attacked by a mob reportedly affiliated with the African National Congress. Violence continued for days. Zikode's home was destroyed during the violence and he and his family fled. Zikode, who went underground for some months because he feared for his life, considered himself a political refugee.

In its 2012 South Africa report Amnesty International reported that Zikode had been publicly threatened with violence by a senior ANC official.

In April 2013 Zikode, along with two others, successfully sued the Minister of Police for violence against his person.

In July 2018, following the assassination of a number of its members, Abahlali baseMjondolo issued a statement claiming that Zikode's life was "in grave danger". It was later reported that Zikode was living underground.

Political commitments

Zikode supports building radical democracy from below and has called for 'a living communism'Politics of Grieving , by Drucilla Cornell, Social Text, 2011 and stressed that land is fundamental to his politics. He is an advocate of land occupations. He is also an advocate of what he terms 'living politics', a form of politics that speaks directly to lived experience and is expressed in plain language.

References

External links
 Revolutionary Ubuntu
 Living Learning
 Testimony from Brother Filippo Mondini
 Citation for the Order of the Holy Nativity to S'bu Zikode
 Is this man the next Nelson Mandela?

Online articles and speeches
 We are the Third Force
 Transcribed speech given at the University of KwaZulu-Natal
 We are the Restless Majority
 Make Crime History
 Silencing the Right to Speak, is taking away Citizenship
 When Choices Can No Longer Be Choices
 Land & Housing: The burning issues
 2008 AGM Speech
 Meaningful Engagement
 The ANC Has Invaded Kennedy Road
 Party Politic Vs Living Politic in Kennedy Road
 Democracy is on the Brink of Catastrophe
 Serving our Life Sentence in the Shacks (with Zodwa Nsibande)
 Land is a Political Question
 When Loyalty Becomes a Threat to Society
 When the Poor Become Powerful Outside of State Control
 Presentation at CUNY Graduate Center for Place, Culture and Politics
 The Politic of Land and Housing, Presentation to University of Chicago Students in Cape Town
 Transcription of talk on Frantz Fanon, Rhodes University, South Africa, 2011
 No freedom without land, 2013
 Despite the state's violence, our fight to escape the mud, shit and fire of South Africa's slums will continue, The Guardian'', 11 November 2013

Interviews
 Resisting degradations and divisions (text)
 Interview with S'bu Zikode, 30 September 2009 (video)

Online films
 Txaboletan bizi direnak by Elkartasun Bideak, 2009 (English dialogue with Basque subtitles)
 Amandla Awethu by Elkartasun Bideak, 2009
 From the Shacks to the Constitutional Court by Dara Kell & Christopher Nizza, 2008
 Dear Mandela by Dara Kell & Christopher Nizza, 2008
 A Place in the City by Jenny Morgan, 2008
 The Right to Know: The Fight for Open Democracy in South Africa by Ben Cashdan, 2007
 Nayager Falls, Abahlali Rises by Sally Gilles and Fazel Khan, 2007
 Breyani & the Councillor by Sally Gilles and Fazel Khan, 2006
 Kennedy Road and the Councillor by Aoibheann O'Sullivan, 2005

Talks

 Talk on Repression in Durban, Rhodes University, Grahamstown, 10 October 2013

Poems and songs
 Dada South (for S'bu Zikode) by Aryan Kaganof
 Abahlali by the Dlamini King Brothers

Living people
South African activists
South African communists
Shack dwellers
1975 births
21st-century squatters
Squatter leaders
Abahlali baseMjondolo members
Housing in South Africa